The Port of Funchal is the port and harbour of Funchal and is frequently used as a stop-over by transatlantic ships, en route from Europe to the Caribbean, as it is the northernmost Atlantic island that lies in the path of the Westerlies.

History
The Port of Funchal was the only major port in Madeira until 2007 when it became fully dedicated to passenger transport – cruise ships and ferries – and other tourist-related boats and yachts.  In that year all remaining fishing activity and cargo trade was moved to the newly developed port of Caniçal,  to the east.

A ferry service between Funchal and Portimão, on the mainland, provided by Naviera Armas sailed weekly from 2008, but was discontinued in 2013 due to a dispute over harbour fees. In the summer of 2018 it was re-instated, but as a seasonal service from July to September, being operated by Grupo Sousa using Naviera Armas's ship called Volcán de Tijarafe, that provided the crossing prior to the 2013 discontinuation, with a maximum speed of 23 knots the crossing takes around 24 hours.

A ferry called Lobo Marinho runs in two hours between Funchal and Porto Santo Island.

Destinations
Porto Santo by Lobo Marinho

See also 
 List of busiest ports in Europe
 List of world's busiest transshipment ports

References 

Funchal
Geography of Madeira
Funchal